Henryk Latocha (born 8 June 1943) is a Polish footballer. He played in eight matches for the Poland national football team from 1968 to 1970.

References

External links
 

1943 births
Living people
Polish footballers
Poland international footballers
Place of birth missing (living people)
Association footballers not categorized by position